Indonesian rock is rock music from Indonesia, a product of the culture and globalizing outlook of the country, similar to this genre's music globally. Indonesian-specific ideas about individualism, interdependency, modernism, and the supernatural have also been observed in the rock videos and music of the nation.

One of the largest rock festivals in Indonesia is the Jakarta Rock Parade, a 3-day festival recently hosting over 100 bands.

History

1940s - 1960s

Rock music began to enter Indonesia around the 1950s during the western rock fever. However, the heyday of rock music in Indonesia was preceded by the band The Rolles (1967) with the genre of jazz rock music. They brought music with different concepts so that they were able to play with the tastes of music lovers at that time. The band was also able to survive and was still popular until the 1980s.

In that era, Indonesian-Dutch rock bands were also very popular, such as The Tielman Brothers, which was founded in 1947 by several youths from Kupang (Reggy, Ponthon, Andy and Loulou Tielman). The band is generally seen as the founder of Indorock, although other Indorock bands have existed before them. Being ethnically Indonesian and playing Western music for white audiences in the Netherlands and Germany.

1970s - 1990s 

The development of rock music in Indonesia grew rapidly when rock bands such as God Bless, Gang Pegangsaan, Giant Step and Rawa Rontek moved quickly to strengthen the rock music genre in Indonesia. Along with the development of rock music in Indonesia, the term "Underground" emerged to group bands with the concept of loud, wild and extreme music.

The 1980s can be said to be the golden era of rock music in Indonesia because early 1988 became the first history in which rock music was performed directly in front of the public.

Then when slow rock music from Malaysia started to boom thanks to the appearance of the band Search through the hit song "Isabela". So in Indonesia the slow rock genre began to gain wide popularity. An Indonesian musician who is famous for playing the slow rock genre is Deddy Dores.

In addition, there are also many works of Deddy Dores performed by Nike Ardilla, Cony Dio, Poppy Mercury, Mayank Sari. The pattern of Indonesian slow rock has also plagued other musicians or singers in Indonesia such as Oppie Andaresta, Minel, Inka Christy, Lady Avisha, Cut Irna, and others. The popularity of Indonesian slow rock occurred during the 1980s to 1990s. In that era, Indonesian Rock mostly had a mellow and sad music style

List of bands
This is a list of Indonesian rock bands:
 ADA Band
 The Changcuters
 Cokelat
 Dewa 19
 Drive
 Edane
 God Bless
 Guruh Gipsy 
 Gigi
 Jamrud
 J-Rocks
 Kekal
 Koes Plus
 Koil
 Kotak
 Padi
 Pee Wee Gaskins
 Killing Me Inside
 Navicula
 Netral
 Nidji
 Noah (band)
 Nymphea
 /rif
 Sajama Cut
 Shorthand Phonetics
 Slank
 Sore
 Sucker Head
 Superman Is Dead
 The S.I.G.I.T.
 Tielman Brothers
 Voice of Baceprot
 Zeke and the Popo

See also
Indo pop
Alternative
Turbo-folk, presenting similarities with 90's Indonesian rock music. 
Music of Indonesia
List of Indonesian musicians

References

Rock bands
 
Indonesian styles of music
Lists of musicians by nationality
Rock